Blata is a village in the Lika region of Croatia, in the municipality of Saborsko, Karlovac County.

History

Culture

Demographics
According to the 2011 census, the village of Blata has 54 inhabitants. This represents 174.19% of its pre-war population according to the 1991 census.

The 1991 census recorded that 96.77% of the village population were ethnic Serbs (30/31) and 3.23% were of other ethnic origin (1/31).

Sights
 Blaćansko lake

Notable natives and residents

See also 
 Saborsko massacre

References

Populated places in Karlovac County
Serb communities in Croatia